(), also known by its full name , is a character encoding scheme. The , which published the character set, also published computer software and TrueType fonts to accompany it.

Conceptualized in 1996, the first version of the CD-ROM was released in July 1997. For a time, the Mojikyō Institute also offered a web subscription, termed " WEB", which had more up-to-date characters. 

, Mojikyō encoded 174,975 characters. Among those, 150,366 characters (86%) then belonged to the extended Chinese–Japanese–Korean–Vietnamese (CJKV) family. Many of Mojikyō's characters are considered obsolete or obscure, and are not encoded by any other character set, including the most widely used international text encoding standard, Unicode.

Originally a paid proprietary software product, as of 2015, the Mojikyō Institute began to upload its latest releases to Internet Archive as freeware, as a memorial to honor one of its developers, who died that year. On December 15, 2018, version 4.0 was released. The next day, Ishikawa announced that without Furuya this would be the final release of Mojikyō.

Premise 
The  encoding was created to provide a complete index of Chinese, Korean, and Japanese characters. It also encodes a large number of characters in ancient scripts, such as the oracle bone script, the seal script, and Sanskrit (Siddhaṃ). For many characters, it is the only character encoding to encode them, and its data is often used as a starting point for Unicode proposals. However,  has much looser standards than Unicode for encoding, which leads  to have many encoded glyphs of dubious, or even unintentionally fictional, origin. As such, while many non-Unicode  characters are suitable for addition to Unicode, not all can become Unicode characters, due to the differing standards of evidence required by each.

Composition 
The  fonts are TrueType fonts that come in a ZIP file and are each around 25 megabytes; the different fonts contain different numbers of characters. Also included is a Windows executable that implements a graphical character map, the " Character Map", .  allows users to browse through the  fonts, and copy and paste characters in lieu of typing them on the keyboard. As opposed to the regular Windows character map, or for that matter KCharSelect, which both support TrueType fonts,  displays the numbered  encoding slot of the requested character.

Encoding 
For example, hentaigana  has  encoding MJ090007 and Unicode encoding U+1B008. A difference, however, is that  encodings displayed this way are decimal, while Unicode's U+ encoding is hexadecimal.

From the earliest days of Unicode,  has both influenced—and been influenced by—the standard. Glyphs originating from  first appear in a proposal to the Ideographic Rapporteur Group (IRG), which is responsible for maintaining all CJK blocks in Unicode, on 18 April 2002. In May 2007,  played a minor role in an eventually successful series of proposals to encode the Tangut script in Unicode;  already had within its encoding 6,000 Tangut characters by October 2002.

Not all Unicode characters with  origins (JK-prefixed J-Sources) have the same representative glyph in the code chart as in the  font; some characters had their shapes changed before final encoding, as investigation showed the shapes assigned by the Mojikyō Institute were wrong.

Blocks 
 it encoded 174,975 characters. Among those, 150,366 characters then belonged to the extended CJKV family. Many of the encoded characters are considered obsolete or otherwise obscure, and are not encoded by any other character set, including the international standard, Unicode. Each  character has a unique number, and the characters are organized into blocks.

 puts CJKV characters in different blocks according to their traditional Kangxi radical. Common radicals containing an especially high number of characters, such as Radicals 9 and 162, are split further by stroke order.

No unification 
Unlike Unicode,  purposely avoids Han unification; no attempt at compactness of the encoding is made, nor is there an attempt to keep all common characters below U+FFFF as there is in Unicode. 

Unicode, on the other hand, sorts its CJK into blocks based on how common they are: the most common are generally put into the Basic Multilingual Plane, while those that are rare or obscure are put into the Astral Planes.

License 
 is proprietary software under a restrictive license. Originally, the Mojikyō Institute tried to prevent its character data from being used, and threatened those who published conversion tables to and from its character set. Mere data, sometimes including the shapes of letters, are considered in many jurisdictions to be common property as they do not meet the threshold of originality.

Due to this legacy, however,  disallowed  data as of 2020.

Collected writing systems

Living 
 Chinese — Hanzi
 Japanese — Kanji, Kana (including Hentaigana)
 Korean — Hanja
 Latin alphabet with diacritics
 Cyrillic script with diacritics

Dead or obsolete 
 Ancient Chinese
Oracle bone script
 Seal script
 Taiwanese kana
 Vietnamese — Chữ Nôm
 Sanskrit — Siddhaṃ
 Tangut script
 Sui script

See also 
 Han unification
 JIS X 0208
 List of CJK fonts
 TRON

References

Notes

External links 
 

Character sets
Encodings of Asian languages
Encodings of Japanese
1997 establishments in Japan
Software companies established in 1997
Han character input
Chinese-language computing
Japanese-language computing
Korean-language computing
Indic computing
Language software for Windows
CJK typefaces
Symbol typefaces
Latin-script typefaces
Tangut script
Windows-only freeware